Sesquiplarius, plural sesquiplares, was an inferior, low-ranking Roman officer, who received a ration and a half or increased payment valuing the additional ration based on their valor. As part of cavalry, one decurio, one duplicarius, and one sesquiplarius was assigned to one turma. Golden badged sesquiplares were named Torquati sesquiplares.

See also

 List of Roman army unit types

References

Ancient Roman titles
Military ranks of ancient Rome